This is an article about South Point on Wilsons Promontory, Victoria, Australia; see also South Point (disambiguation)

South Point is the southernmost point of the Australian mainland.
It is at the tip of Wilsons Promontory in the state of Victoria and is part of Wilsons Promontory National Park.

See also 
 List of extreme points of Australia
 Cape York, the northernmost point on the Australian mainland
 Cape Byron, the easternmost point on the Australian mainland
 Steep Point, westernmost point on the Australian mainland

References

External links 
 Wilsons Promontory national site

Bass Strait
Wilsons Promontory
Headlands of Victoria (Australia)
Extreme points of Australia